Mongolian National Democratic Party may refer to:

Mongolian National Democratic Party (1992–1999) (Монголын Үндэсний Ардчилсан Нам), a cofounder of the Democratic Party in 2000
Mongolian National Democratic Party (2005) (Монгол Үндэсний Ардчилсан Нам), known until 2011 as the National New Party (Үндэсний Шинэ Нам, ҮШН), formed the Justice Coalition with the Mongolian People's Revolutionary Party

See also
Democratic Party (Mongolia)
List of political parties in Mongolia